XQuartz is an open-source version of the X.Org X server, a component of the X Window System (X11, or shortened to simply X, and sometimes informally X-Windows) that runs on macOS.  It formally replaced Apple's internal X11 app. The name "XQuartz" derives from Quartz, part of the macOS Core Graphics framework, to which XQuartz connects these applications. XQuartz allows cross-platform applications using X11 for the GUI to run on macOS, many of which are not specifically designed for macOS. This includes numerous scientific and academic software projects.

History 

X11.app was initially available as a downloadable public beta for Mac OS X 10.2 Jaguar and later included as a standard package for Mac OS X 10.3 Panther. In Mac OS X 10.4 Tiger X11.app was an optional install included on the install DVD. Mac OS X 10.5 Leopard, Mac OS X 10.6 Snow Leopard, and Mac OS X 10.7 Lion installed X11.app by default, but from OS X 10.8 Mountain Lion on Apple dropped dedicated support for X11.app, with users being directed to the open source XQuartz project (to which Apple contributes) instead.

In Mac OS X 10.4 Tiger, Apple's X11 implemented X11 protocol release 6.6 (X11R6.6). This implementation includes an XFree86 4.4 based X11 window server, Quartz rootless window manager, libraries, and basic utilities such as xterm. "Rootless" means that X window applications show up on the Quartz desktop, appearing like any other windowed Quartz application (that is, not in a virtual desktop contained within another window). In Mac OS X Leopard, X11 was updated to use X.Org Server (X11R7.2) rather than XFree86. The source code for X11 is available from Apple. Some source code is available under the Apple Public Source License while the bulk is licensed under the MIT License.

Current version 
The current version of XQuartz is a DDX (Device Dependent X) included in the X.Org Server and implements support for hardware-accelerated 2D graphics (in versions prior to 2.1), hardware OpenGL acceleration and integration with Aqua, the macOS graphical user interface (GUI). As of version 2.8.0, XQuartz does not provide support for high-resolution Retina displays to X11 apps, which run in pixel-doubled mode on high-resolution displays.

List of versions (since 2010)

See also

MacX, X11 support on Classic Mac OS
XWayland, to support X application under Wayland
XDarwin, an implementation of X for macOS that preceded XQuartz, and supports versions of macOS before 10.3 unlike XQuartz

References

External links
 

MacOS-only software made by Apple Inc.
Software using the Apple Public Source License
X servers